The Cronk Islands are a group of Antarctic islands lying northeast of Hollin Island, in the Windmill Islands. They were first mapped from air photos taken by USN Operation Highjump in 1946 and 1947. They were named by the US-ACAN for Caspar Cronk, glaciologist at Wilkes Station in 1958.

See also
 Composite Antarctic Gazetteer
 List of Antarctic and sub-Antarctic islands
 List of Antarctic islands south of 60° S
 SCAR
 Territorial claims in Antarctica

References

External links 

Windmill Islands